Brachinulus viettei is a species of beetle in the family Carabidae, the only species in the genus Brachinulus.

References

Brachininae